Giria is a monotypic moth genus of the family Erebidae erected by James Farish Malcolm Fawcett in 1916. Its only species, Giria pectinicornis, was first described by George Thomas Bethune-Baker in 1909. It is found from Liberia to Kenya

References

Catocalinae
Insects of the Democratic Republic of the Congo
Moths of Africa